Perirhithrum is a genus of tephritid  or fruit flies in the family Tephritidae.

Species
Perirhithrum marshalli Bezzi, 1920

References

Tephritinae
Tephritidae genera
Diptera of Africa